In computer programming, append is the operation for concatenating linked lists or arrays in some high-level programming languages.

Lisp
Append originates in the Lisp programming language. The append procedure takes zero or more (linked) lists as arguments, and returns the concatenation of these lists.
(append '(1 2 3) '(a b) '() '(6))
;Output: (1 2 3 a b 6)
Since the append procedure must completely copy all of its arguments except the last, both its time and space complexity are O(n) for a list of  elements.  It may thus be a source of inefficiency if used injudiciously in code.

The nconc procedure (called append! in Scheme) performs the same function as append, but destructively: it alters the cdr of each argument (save the last), pointing it to the next list.

Implementation
Append can easily be defined recursively in terms of cons. The following is a simple implementation in Scheme, for two arguments only:
(define append
  (lambda (ls1 ls2)
    (if (null? ls1)
      ls2
      (cons (car ls1) (append (cdr ls1) ls2)))))

Append can also be implemented using fold-right:
(define append
   (lambda (a b)
      (fold-right cons b a)))

Other languages
Following Lisp, other high-level languages which feature linked lists as primitive data structures have adopted an append. Haskell uses the ++ operator to append lists. OCaml uses the @ operator to append lists.

Other languages use the + or ++ symbols for nondestructive string/list/array concatenation.

Prolog
The logic programming language Prolog features a built-in append predicate, which can be implemented as follows:
append([],Ys,Ys).
append([X|Xs],Ys,[X|Zs]) :-
    append(Xs,Ys,Zs).
This predicate can be used for appending, but also for picking lists apart. Calling
 ?- append(L,R,[1,2,3]).
yields the solutions:

 L = [], R = [1, 2, 3] ;
 L = [1], R = [2, 3] ;
 L = [1, 2], R = [3] ;
 L = [1, 2, 3], R = []

Miranda
This right-fold, from Hughes (1989:5-6), has the same semantics (by example) as the Scheme implementation above, for two arguments.

 append a b = reduce cons b a

Where reduce is Miranda's name for fold, and cons constructs a list from two values or lists.

For example,

 append [1,2] [3,4] = reduce cons [3,4] [1,2]
     = (reduce cons [3,4]) (cons 1 (cons 2 nil))
     = cons 1 (cons 2 [3,4]))
         (replacing cons by cons and nil by [3,4])
     = [1,2,3,4]

Haskell
This right-fold has the same effect as the Scheme implementation above:
append :: [a] -> [a] -> [a]
append xs ys = foldr ys xs
This is essentially a reimplementation of Haskell's ++ operator.

Perl
In Perl, the push function is equivalent to the append method, and can be used in the following way.
my @list;
push @list, 1;
push @list, 2, 3;
The end result is a list containing [1, 2, 3]

The unshift function appends to the front of a list, rather than the end
my @list;
unshift @list, 1;
unshift @list, 2, 3;
The end result is a list containing [2, 3, 1]

When opening a file, use the ">>" mode to append rather than over write.
open(my $fh, '>>', "/some/file.txt");
print $fh "Some new text\n";
close $fh;
Note that when opening and closing file handles, one should always check the return value.

Python
In Python, use the list method "extend" or the infix operators + and += to append lists.
l = [1, 2]
l.extend([3, 4, 5])
print l + [6, 7]
After executing this code, l is a list containing [1, 2, 3, 4, 5], while the output generated is the list [1, 2, 3, 4, 5, 6, 7].

Do not confuse with the list method "append", which adds a single element to a list:
l = [1, 2]
l.append(3)
Here, the result is a list containing [1, 2, 3].

Bash
In Bash the append redirect is the usage of ">>" for adding a stream to something, like in the following series of shell commands:
echo Hello world! >text; echo Goodbye world! >>text; cat text
The stream "Goodbye world!" is added to the text file written in the first command. The ";" implies the execution of the given commands in order not simultaneously. So, the final content of the text file is:

References
 Hughes, John. 1989. Why functional programming matters. Computer Journal 32, 2, 98-107. https://web.archive.org/web/20070413005952/http://www.math.chalmers.se/~rjmh/Papers/whyfp.pdf
 Steele, Guy L. Jr.  Common Lisp: The Language, Second Edition.  1990.  pg. 418, description of append.

Functional programming
Lisp (programming language)
Programming constructs
Articles with example code
DOS on IBM PC compatibles